Sidi Boutayeb is a small town and rural commune in Boulemane Province of the Fès-Meknès region of Morocco. At the time of the 2004 census, the commune had a total population of 9522 people living in 1705 households.

Shrine (Zaouia)

Sidi Boutayeb is named after the shrine and tomb of sidi Abou Atayeb, a holy persona whom lived in the area, it is said that Sidi Abou Atayeb is a descendant of Moulay Idriss of Fes.

References

Populated places in Boulemane Province
Rural communes of Fès-Meknès